Walter A. Anderson may refer to:

Walter Artur Anderson (1885–1962), Baltic German ethnologist and folklorist
Walter A. Anderson, Dean of the Steinhardt School of Culture, Education, and Human Development from 1960 until 1964